The women's 100 metres hurdles competition of the athletics events at the 2019 Pan American Games will take place between the 7 and 8 of August at the 2019 Pan American Games Athletics Stadium. The defending Pan American Games champion is Queen Harrison from the United States.

Summary
Over the first hurdle, Sharika Nelvis was first, barely ahead of Andrea Vargas.  Over each hurdle, Nelvis gained inches over Vargas.  By the sixth hurdle, the two had a stride over the field, with Vanessa Clerveaux battling Megan Simmonds for third.  Going into the seventh hurdle, things began to change.  Nelvis started to get awkward approaching the hurdle.  She still cleared but her balance was off, Vargas continued smoothly into the lead.  Nelvis continued swinging her arms and stayed close to Vargas.  Clerveaux struggled, while Simmonds was hitting the eighth hurdle, collegian Chanel Brissett pulled even with Simmonds.  Nelvis hit the ninth hurdle and lost her step, listing to the left going into the final barrier.  Vargas continued to gold, Brissett edging Simmonds for silver while Nelvis barely got over the tenth, finishing in seventh.

Records
Prior to this competition, the existing world and Pan American Games records were as follows:

Schedule

Results
All times shown are in seconds.

Semifinal
Qualification: First 3 in each heat (Q) and next 2 fastest (q) qualified for the final. The results were as follows:

Wind:Heat 1: +0.1 m/s, Heat 2: +0.5 m/s

Final
The results were as follows:

References

100
2019